The Moment(s) may refer to:

Film and television
 The Moment (1979 film), a Romanian film
 The Moment (2013 film), an American film
 The Moment (American TV series), a 2013 reality series
 The Moment (New Zealand TV series), a 2018 comedy series

Literature
 "The Moment" (story), a 2009 science fiction short story by Lawrence M. Schoen
 The Moment, a 2011 novel by Douglas Kennedy

Music

Performers
 The Moment (band), a 1980s UK mod revival band
 The Moments (American group), later Ray, Goodman & Brown, an R&B vocal group
 The Moments (English band), a 1960s rhythm and blues band

Albums
 The Moment (Aaron Yan album) or the title song, 2012
 The Moment (Jimmy MacCarthy album) or the title song, 2002
 The Moment (Kenny Barron album) or the title instrumental, 1994
 The Moment (Kenny G album) or the title instrumental (see below), 1996
 The Moment (Lisa Stansfield album) or the title song, 2004
 The Moment (Manafest album) or the title song, 2014
 The Moment (Stefanie Sun album), 2003
 The Moment, by Atomic Tom, 2010
 The Moment, by Framing Hanley, 2007

Songs
 "The Moment" (Ai song), 2021
 "The Moment" (Kenny G composition), 1996
 "The Moment", by SafetySuit from Life Left to Go, 2008
 "The Moment", by Tame Impala from Currents, 2015

See also
 
 "The One Moment", a 2014 song by OK Go
 Moment (disambiguation)